In mathematics, SO(8) is the special orthogonal group acting on eight-dimensional Euclidean space. It could be either a real or complex simple Lie group of rank 4 and dimension 28.

Spin(8)
The universal cover of SO(8) is the spin group Spin(8).

Center
The center of SO(8) is Z2, the diagonal matrices {±I} (as for all SO(2n) with 2n ≥ 4), while the center of Spin(8) is Z2×Z2 (as for all Spin(4n), 4n ≥ 4).

Triality

SO(8) is unique among the simple Lie groups in that its Dynkin diagram,  (D4 under the Dynkin classification), possesses a three-fold symmetry. This gives rise to peculiar feature of Spin(8) known as triality. Related to this is the fact that the two spinor representations, as well as the fundamental vector representation, of Spin(8) are all eight-dimensional (for all other spin groups the spinor representation is either smaller or larger than the vector representation). The triality automorphism of Spin(8) lives in the outer automorphism group of Spin(8) which is isomorphic to the symmetric group S3 that permutes these three representations. The automorphism group acts on the center Z2 x Z2 (which also has automorphism group isomorphic to S3 which may also be considered as the general linear group over the finite field with two elements,  S3 ≅GL(2,2)). When one quotients Spin(8) by one central Z2, breaking this symmetry and obtaining SO(8), the remaining outer automorphism group is only Z2. The triality symmetry acts again on the further quotient SO(8)/Z2.

Sometimes Spin(8) appears naturally in an "enlarged" form, as the automorphism group of Spin(8), which breaks up as a semidirect product: Aut(Spin(8)) ≅ PSO (8) ⋊ S3.

Unit octonions
Elements of SO(8) can be described with unit octonions, analogously to how elements of SO(2) can be described with unit complex numbers and elements of SO(4) can be described with unit quaternions. However the relationship is more complicated, partly due to the non-associativity of the octonions. A general element in SO(8) can be described as the product of 7 left-multiplications, 7 right-multiplications and also 7 bimultiplications by unit octonions (a bimultiplication being the composition of a left-multiplication and a right-multiplication by the same octonion and is unambiguously defined due to octonions obeying the Moufang identities).

It can be shown that an element of SO(8) can be constructed with bimultiplications, by first showing that pairs of reflections through the origin in 8-dimensional space correspond to pairs of bimultiplications by unit octonions. The triality automorphism of Spin(8) described below provides similar constructions with left multiplications and right multiplications.

Octonions and triality
A triple of maps  that preserve this identity, so that  is called an isotopy. If , then following the above  can be described as the product of bimultiplications of unit octonions, say . Let  be the corresponding products of left and right multiplications by the conjugates (i.e., the multiplicative inverses) of the same unit octonions, so , . A simple calculation shows that  is an isotopy.

This "triality" automorphism is exceptional among spin groups.

Root system

Weyl group
Its Weyl/Coxeter group has 4! × 8 = 192 elements.

Cartan matrix

See also
 Octonions
 Clifford algebra
 G2

References

 (originally published in 1954 by Columbia University Press) 

Lie groups